Torcuato Mendiri y Colera (1813–1884) was a Spanish nobleman. He fought on the side of the Carlists in the First (1833–1839) and Third (1872–1876) Carlist Wars.

References

External links
 http://titulosnobiliarioscaducados.blogspot.com.es/2013/03/los-decretos-reales-de-concesion-de.html
 http://www.blasoneshispanos.com/Genealogia/03-ElencoDeNobleza/TitulosNobiliarosA.htm
 Archivo Provincial de Álava, CH1.89

1813 births
1884 deaths
Marquesses of Spain
Counts of Spain
Military personnel of the First Carlist War